Sigfrid "Sigge" Öberg (22 February 1907 – 2 April 1949) was a Swedish  ice hockey, football and bandy player, known for representing Hammarby IF in all three sports.

He won a silver medal with the Swedish national hockey team at the 1928 Winter Olympics and four domestic league titles with Hammarby.

Athletic career

Ice hockey
In 1926, at age 18, Öberg made his debut for Hammarby IF in Elitserien, Sweden's top tier. He would go on to form a feared forward line with Helge Johansson and Erik Larsson in the upcoming years.

Öberg won four Swedish championships – in 1932, 1933, 1936 and 1937 – with the club, their first domestic titles.

He was known as a physical right winger and a particularly skilled skater, who possessed a great shooting ability and stickhandling.

Öberg won 25 competitive caps for the Swedish national team, scoring a total of 6 goals, and represented his country at several major tournaments; the biggest achievement was winning the silver medal in the 1928 Winter Olympics. Öberg is a recipient of the honorary award Stora Grabbars Märke and was inducted into the Swedish Hockey Hall of Fame in 2012; both awards are handed out by the Swedish Ice Hockey Association.

He retired from ice hockey in 1939.

Football
Öberg also played football with Hammarby IF and made his debut for the senior team in 1926, at age 18.

Up until his retirement from the sport in 1935, Öberg made 124 league appearances for Hammarby in the Swedish second tier Division 2, scoring 54 goals playing as a forward.

Bandy
Öberg was also a prominent bandy player for Hammarby IF between 1925–1939. He was a member of the Swedish national team and won a total of five caps for his country. As well as in ice hockey, Öberg was a recipient of the honorary award Stora Grabbars Märke in bandy, an award that is handed out by the Swedish Bandy Association.

Personal life
He grew up in a working-class home in a southern part of Stockholm known as Södermalm, where he lived his whole life. On 2 April 1949, Öberg died by drowning in the waterway Hammarbyleden, at the age of 42.

References

External links

1907 births
1949 deaths
Deaths by drowning
Ice hockey people from Stockholm
Ice hockey players at the 1928 Winter Olympics
Medalists at the 1928 Winter Olympics
Olympic ice hockey players of Sweden
Olympic medalists in ice hockey
Olympic silver medalists for Sweden
Sweden international bandy players
Swedish ice hockey players
Swedish bandy players
Swedish footballers
Hammarby Hockey (1921–2008) players
Hammarby IF Bandy players
Hammarby Fotboll players
Association football forwards